Boustani is a Lebanese surname. Variations of the name, due to transliteration, include: Boustani as well as Boustany, Bisteni, Bistany, Bostany, Bustani, Besteni, and Bestene ( / ALA-LC: Bustānī). The name, a nisba, derives from the Arabic word for garden (a loanword from Middle Persian “bōyestān”) and is thought to date back to at least the 15th Century.

The family has its roots in a place named El-Bassatin, in the village of Jableh, near Lattakia, Syria. In the beginning of the 16th century, and after the Ottoman conquest of the Middle East, Muqim (Abu Mahfouz) left his home town and went towards Mount-Lebanon, stopping at Dahr Safra, then Bqerqacha, a village at the foot of the Cedars of Lebanon. Muqim had three sons, Mahfouz, Abd el Aziz and Nader. Abd el Aziz resided in Deir el Kamar. Nader and his family settled in the Chouf region, principally Deir el Kamar and Debbiyé.

Muqim and his eldest son Mahfouz went back to the northern regions of the country. His descendants still bear the name Mahfouz.

Following social and political upheavals, the Boustanis settled in every single region of Lebanon – in Giyeh, Marj, Jounieh, Tripoli, in the Koura and the Beqaa – as well as in Syria (Damascus and Aleppo) Turkey and Egypt. Throughout the two last centuries, and especially in the beginning of the 20th, the great migration of the Boustanis towards Europe and the New World began.

During the two last centuries, members of the family emigrated from different Lebanese cities to numerous countries around the world. However, the Boustanis who presently live in Lebanon, as well as those of the Diaspora, constitute one sole family.

The Boustanis were a family of many talents, to which were born eminent archbishops, great statesmen, businessmen, writers and poets in Lebanon and in the Diaspora countries. Among the bishops were: Abdallah (1780–1866), Boutros (1819–1883) and Augustin (1875–1957).

Notable people
 Alberto Bustani Adem, Academic and former President of the Monterrey Campus of Tecnologico de Monterrey, Mexico
 Augustin Bostani (1876–1957), Eparch of Sidon
 Boutros al-Boustani, Lebanese intellectual poet, writer, encyclopaedist and pioneer of the Arabic literary renaissance
 Charles Boustany, former Congressman from Louisiana, United States of America
 Don Bustany (born 1928), American radio and television producer
 Doris Ann Boustany Reggie, mother of Victoria Reggie Kennedy, widow of Senator Edward "Ted" Kennedy, brother of President John F. Kennedy
 Emile Bustani, was a Lebanese Tycoon, entrepreneur, Astro-Physicist (American University of Beirut) and Civil Engineer (Massachusetts Institute of Technology), philanthropist and politician.
 Emile Boustany, former Commander of General rank in the Lebanese Armed Forces
 Fouad Frem al-Boustani, poet, intellectual, Founder and Former president of the Lebanese University
 José Maurício Bustani, Brazilian Ambassador to the Court of St James's (United Kingdom) and former director-general of the Organisation for the Prohibition of Chemical Weapons
 Myrna Bustani, daughter of Emile Bustani, and first female in the Lebanese Parliament
 Maroun Boustani, Dean of the Law School, La Sagesse University, Beirut
 Malaz Boustani, MD, MPH, Founding Director of the Sandra Eskenazi Center for Brain Care Innovation Center and Founder of the Indiana University Center for Health Innovation and Implementation Science
 Nora Boustany, Lebanese educator and journalist
 Suleyman al-Boustani (Effendi), (1856–1925) nephew of Boutros al-Boustani, translator of Homer's Iliad into Arabic, and Minister of Commerce and Agriculture in the last Ottoman Government
 Pierre Bostani (1819–1899), Assistant to the Pontifical Throne, Archbishop of Tyre, Count of Rome, Bishop of Saint-John-Acre, Council Father of the First Vatican Council
 Ricardo Alvarado Bestene, governor of Arauca, Colombia
 Wissam Boustany, Lebanese/British concert flutist

References

External links

 
Arabic-language surnames